Joaquim Manuel de Macedo (June 24, 1820 – May 11, 1882) was a Brazilian novelist, doctor, teacher, poet, playwright and journalist, famous for the romance A Moreninha.

He is the patron of the 20th chair of the Brazilian Academy of Letters.

Life

Joaquim Manuel de Macedo was born in the city of Itaboraí, in 1820, to Severino de Macedo Carvalho and Benigna Catarina da Conceição. He graduated in Medicine in 1844, and started to practice it in the inlands of Rio. In the same year, he published his romance A Moreninha. In 1849, he founded the magazine Guanabara, along with Manuel de Araújo Porto-Alegre and Gonçalves Dias. In this magazine, many parts of his lengthy poem A Nebulosa were published.

Returning to Rio, he abandoned Medicine and became a teacher of History and Geography at the Colégio Pedro II. He was very linked to the Brazilian Imperial Family, even becoming a tutor for Princess Isabel's children. He was also a provincial deputy and a general deputy, and a member of the Brazilian Historic and Geographic Institute.

During his last years of life, he suffered mental disturbances. These made his health worse and led to his death on May 11, 1882.

He was married to Maria Catarina de Abreu Sodré, a cousin of poet Álvares de Azevedo. Some historians say that the titular character of his novel A Moreninha was based on her.

Works

Novels
 A Moreninha (1844)
 O Moço Loiro (1845)
 Os Dois Amores (1848)
 Rosa (1849)
 Vicentina (1853)
 O Forasteiro (1855)
 Os Romances da Semana (1861)
 Rio do Quarto (1869)
 A Luneta Mágica (1869)
 As Vítimas-algozes (1869)
 As Mulheres de Mantilha (1870 — 1871)

Political satires
 A Carteira do Meu Tio (1855)
 Memórias do Sobrinho do Meu Tio (1867 — 1868)

Chronicles
 Memórias da Rua do Ouvidor
 Um Passeio pela Cidade do Rio de Janeiro
 Labirinto

Theater plays

Tragedies
 O Cego (1845)
 Cobé (1849)
 Lusbela (1863)

Comedies
 O Fantasma Branco (1856)
 O Primo da Califórnia (1858)
 Luxo e Vaidade (1860)
 A Torre em Concurso (1863)
 Cincinato Quebra-Louças (1873)

Poetry
 A Nebulosa (1857)

Biographies
 Ano Biográfico Brasileiro (1876)
 Mulheres Célebres (1878)

Medical thesis
 Considerações sobre a Nostalgia

External links

 Macedo's biography at the official site of the Brazilian Academy of Letters 
 
 

1820 births
1882 deaths
Brazilian male poets
Brazilian medical writers
19th-century Brazilian poets
Brazilian journalists
People from Rio de Janeiro (state)
19th-century Brazilian novelists
Patrons of the Brazilian Academy of Letters
19th-century journalists
Male journalists
19th-century Brazilian dramatists and playwrights
Portuguese male poets
Brazilian male novelists
Brazilian male dramatists and playwrights
19th-century Brazilian male writers